A magnanery is the site of sericulture, or silk farming, similar to a farm being the site of agriculture. The yeoman who runs it is called a magnanier or, more recently, a mangnan. The word magnanière, meaning building dedicated to sericulture, is also seen.

The word originated from the Occitan word magnan, as Provence was the centre of French sericulture.

The area around Saint-Hippolyte-du-Fort has magnaneries, and the town itself has a silk museum.

References

Sericulture
Silk production
Textile industry of France